Gaius Antistius Vetus can refer to the following Roman people:

 Gaius Antistius Vetus (consul 30 BC)
 Gaius Antistius Vetus, Augustus's quaestor, consul in 6 BC
 Gaius Antistius Vetus (consul 23)
 Gaius Antistius Vetus (consul 50)
 Gaius Antistius Vetus (consul 96)